Fayzabad District is one of 30 districts that comprise Badakhshan province, Afghanistan. The city of Fayzabad serves as its capital. In 2005, several portions of the district were sub-divided to create several new districts within the province. The remaining portion is home to approximately 75,577 residents, who are mostly peasants.

See also 
 Districts of Afghanistan

References

External links 
  (Nature & Culture)

Districts of Badakhshan Province